Reaves is a surname. Notable people with the name include:

Austin Reaves (born 1998), American basketball player
Darrin Reaves (born 1993), American football running back free agent
Emily Grace Reaves (born 2001), American actress and model
James Reaves (born 1982), American basketball player
Jeremy Reaves (born 1996), American football free safety
Jessi Reaves (born 1986), American artist
John Reaves (1950–2017), American football player
Jordan Reaves (born 1990), Canadian football defensive lineman
Ken Reaves (born 1944), American football defensive back
Mallory Reaves (born 1984), American writer
Michael Reaves (born 1950), American writer
Pearl Reaves (1929–2000), American singer and guitarist
Ryan Reaves (born 1987), Canadian-American professional ice hockey player
Shawn Reaves (born 1978), American actor
Willard Reaves (born 1959), American-Canadian gridiron football running back

See also
Reavis (disambiguation)
Reeves (surname)
Reave
Reeves (disambiguation)